Aetoxylon is a single species genus (monotypic) of trees only found (endemic) in Borneo, of the flowering plant family Thymelaeaceae. The single species is Aetoxylon sympetalum, commonly known as gaharu buaya or crocodile eaglewood.

Bark is dark brown to black. The specific epithet sympetalum is from the Latin meaning "united petals". Habitat is lowland forests from sea level to  altitude.

References

Octolepidoideae
Monotypic Malvales genera
Endemic flora of Borneo
Trees of Borneo
Flora of the Borneo lowland rain forests